Shareef' is a surname.  Notable people with the name include:

Abdulaziz Shareef (born 1993), Qatari footballer
Adam Shareef, Maldivian politician
Ali Shareef (born 1979), Maldivian track and field sprint athlete
Aminath Shareef, Maldivian film actress
Asad Shareef (born 1964), Maldivian film actor and politician
Derrick Shareef, American terrorist
Easa Shareef, Maldivian film director, actor, screen-writer, editor and lyricist
Hussain Shareef (born 1998), Maldivian footballer
Hussain Shareef (judoka), Kuwaiti judoka
Ibrahim Labaan Shareef (born 1996), Maldivian footballer
Jay Shareef (born 1982), British stand-up comedian and broadcaster
K. S. G. Haja Shareef, Indian politician 
Shamau Shareef (born 1983), Maldivian politician
Shidhatha Shareef, Maldivian politician
Umer Shareef (1955–2021), Pakistani actor, comedian and television personality
Zahid Shareef (born 1967), Pakistani hockey player

See also
Shareef (given name)
Sherif, given name and surname